UPRN may refer to:

 Unique Property Reference Number, a UID for referring to premises or parcels of land, in Great Britain
 Union for the New Republic, a French political party that existed from 1958 to 1967
 Union for the New Republic (Gabon), a political party in Gabon in 2007